Asambhava (Kannada: ಅಸಂಭವ) is a 1986 Indian Kannada film,  directed by  D. Rajendra Babu and produced by H. N. Maruthi and Venugopal. The film stars V. Ravichandran, Ambika, Mukhyamantri Chandru and Lakshman in the lead roles. The film has musical score by Shankar–Ganesh.

Cast

V. Ravichandran
Ambika
Mukhyamantri Chandru
Lakshman
Sumithra
Umashree

References

External links
 

1986 films
1980s Kannada-language films
Films scored by Shankar–Ganesh
Films directed by D. Rajendra Babu